Ricardo Enrique Silva is a Cuban doctor and dissident who was imprisoned during the Black Spring in 2003.

Physicians for Human Rights reports that he has eye problems.

References

Amnesty International prisoners of conscience held by Cuba
Cuban dissidents
Cuban physicians
Living people
Year of birth missing (living people)
Cuban prisoners and detainees